Buckwitz is a surname. Notable people with the surname include:

 Harry Buckwitz (1904-1987), German actor, theatre director, and theatre manager
 Lisa Buckwitz (born 1994), German bobsledder

See also
 

Surnames of German origin